Scoparia ancipitella is a species of moth in the family Crambidae. It is found in most of Europe (except the Iberian Peninsula, the Benelux, Ukraine and most of the Balkan Peninsula). It has also been recorded from China (Gansu, Hebei, Heilongjiang, Henan, Jilin, Ningxia, Shaanxi, Sichuan, Xinjiang).

The wingspan is 18–21 mm. Adults are on wing in July and August.

The larvae probably feed on mosses and lichens.

References

Moths described in 1855
Scorparia
Moths of Europe